Jankowice  (Yankovychi)  is a village in the administrative district of Gmina Chłopice, within Jarosław County, Subcarpathian Voivodeship, in south-eastern Poland.

The village has a population of 800.

References

Jankowice